"Everyday" is a song by American recording artist Angie Stone. It was written by Stone along with D'Angelo for her debut studio album, Black Diamond (1999), while production was overseen by Russell Elevado. The song was released as the album's third and final single.

Track listings

Charts

References

External links
 

1999 songs
2000 singles
Arista Records singles
Angie Stone songs
Songs written by D'Angelo
Songs written by Angie Stone